Koushik Roy is an Indian television and film actor. Roy is best known for playing the lead antagonist, Krishnendu Sengupta, in Bojhena Se Bojhena and main protagonist in Khorkuto. He has also played the lead role in Onnyo Bwosonto and a supporting role in Ekla Cholo.

Filmography
Dharmajuddha (2022)
Flyover (2021)
WMT 9615 (2019)
Bhagshesh (2018)
Maati (2018)
Ekla Cholo (2015)
Onnyo Bwosonto (2015)
The Third Eye (short film) (2015)
Teen Patti (2014)
Goynar Baksho (2013)
Proloy (2013)

Television

Web series

Awards

References

External links

Living people
Bengali male actors
Indian male television actors
21st-century Indian male actors
Indian male soap opera actors
Bengali male television actors
Male actors in Bengali cinema
Year of birth missing (living people)